Jürgen Rumor (born 19 February 1945) is a former professional German footballer.

Rumor started his footballing career at 1. FC Köln, where he made 56 Fußball-Bundesliga appearances before moving to 1. FC Kaiserslautern. After 63 games, Rumor transferred to Hertha BSC. As a Hertha player, Rumor was involved in the 1971 Bundesliga scandal for having taken a bribe to fix a match. On 23 January 1972, Rumor was fined 15,000 Deutsche Mark and given a lifelong ban from football by the German Football Association. However, he was later given an amnesty and played a further 16 Bundesliga games for Tennis Borussia Berlin during the 1974–75 season.

See also 
 Bundesliga scandal (1971)

References

External links 
 

1945 births
Living people
German footballers
Association football defenders
Bundesliga players
1. FC Köln players
1. FC Kaiserslautern players
Hertha BSC players
Tennis Borussia Berlin players
Association football controversies